The Digby Gut is a narrow channel connecting the Bay of Fundy with the Annapolis Basin. The town of Digby, Nova Scotia is located on the inner portion of the western side of the Gut. The eastern entrance is marked by the Point Prim Lighthouse. Strong tidal currents, numerous rocky ledges, frequent fogs and unpredictable winds make it a dangerous passage requiring a pilot or local knowledge. Tide flows create 5 knot tidal currents and create numerous whirlpools and eddies. The gut is about a half nautical mile in width and bordered by high rocky cliffs. It marks a break in the North Mountain ridge along the Annapolis Valley and is the eastern end of Digby Neck. Digby Gut had its origins as the northern terminus of the ancient Bear River, part of which is now a drowned river valley.

Digby Gut is overlooked by the Digby Pines Resort and has been used daily for many years by Digby-Saint John ferries such as the SS Princess Helene and MV Princess of Acadia. The famous poet Bliss Carman wrote a classic Canadian poem of courage about a fearless twelve-year-old sailor who single-handedly sailed a schooner through Digby Gut during a storm, entitled "Arnold, Master of the Scud".

References

External links
Live web cam of Point Prim, western entrance to Digby Gut

Bodies of water of Nova Scotia
Landforms of Annapolis County, Nova Scotia
Landforms of Digby County, Nova Scotia
Channels of Canada